Body swaps, first popularized in Western anglophone culture by the personal identity chapter of John Locke's Essay Concerning Human Understanding, have been a common storytelling device in fiction media. Novels such as Vice Versa (1882) and Freaky Friday (1972) have inspired numerous film adaptations and retellings, as well as television series and episodes, many with titles derived from "Freaky Friday". In 2013, Disney Channel held a Freaky Freakend with seven shows that featured body-swapping episodes. This list features exchanges between two beings, and thus excludes similar phenomena of body hopping, spirit possession, transmigration, and avatars, unless the target being's mind is conversely placed in the source's body. It also excludes age transformations that are sometimes reviewed or promoted as body swaps, as in the movies Big and 17 Again; identity/role swaps, typically between clones, look-alikes, or doppelgängers; and characters with multiple personalities.

Books

Short stories and operas

Films

Television

Shows with body swaps
The following shows have a body swap as a major storyline or feature a character who has swapped bodies over multiple episodes.

Episodes with body swaps
TV episodes where characters swap bodies. See also graphic novels and manga.

Video games

Graphic novels and manga
Some graphic novels and manga series feature stories that center around a body swap, while others have a story arc or a character that body swaps. These include anime and live-action adaptations if the original storyline was in the manga or comic.

Music

See also
 Mind uploading in fiction
 Whole-body transplants in popular culture

Explanatory notes

References

External links
 "Identity Exchange", The Encyclopedia of Science Fiction, 3rd ed. (online as SFE at sf-encyclopedia.com) – entry by David R. Langford
 Body swap Tags IMDb